Gus is a masculine given name. 

Gus or GUS may also refer to:

Entertainment 
 Gus (1976 film), an American family comedy
 Gus (2011 film), an Australian animated short
 Gulder Ultimate Search, a Nigerian reality show
 Guster, formerly Gus, an American alternative rock band

Military and police 
 Groupes urbains de sécurité, a defunct Moroccan police unit
 Gus-class LCAC, a Soviet Navy assault hovercraft class
 GUS, designation of slow westbound UG convoys in World War II

Places 
 Gus, Kentucky, an unincorporated community
 Gus (river), Russia

Other uses 
 GUS (retailer), a defunct British retailer
 Central Statistical Office (Poland)
 Global University Systems, a Dutch education company
 Gravis Ultrasound, a PC sound card
 Gus' Pretzels, a pretzel maker in St Louis, Missouri
 GUS reporter system, a molecular biology technique
 Gus's, a cafe in Canberra, Australia